Timandra convectaria is a species of moth of the family Geometridae first described by Francis Walker in 1861. It is found in Taiwan and China.

The larvae feed on Polygonum perfoliatum.

Subspecies
Timandra convectaria convectaria
Timandra convectaria baguionis (Prout, 1938)

References

Moths described in 1861
Timandrini
Moths of Japan